Gabrielle Alexa Gutierrez (born September 29, 2005) is a Filipina-American stage actress prominently known as the first Asian and Filipina to play the lead role of Matilda in a major musical theatre adaptation of the novel of the same name.

Career
Gutierrez is a gifted child piano prodigy winning a contest that has given her the opportunity to perform at Carnegie Hall when she was five years old.
Gutierrez began her formal music career in 2014 when she was cast as Ngana in Paper Mill Playhouse production of Rodgers-Hammerstein classic South Pacific. 
In late 2014, she was cast as Annie Who for the National Tour of How the Grinch Stole Christmas production. While working on the said musical, she was cast as lead for the Royal Shakespeare Company's Matilda The Musical.

Personal life
Gutierrez traces her roots back from Bukidnon, Philippines. She is currently residing in Springfield, New Jersey with her older sister and their parents.

Filmography

Theatre

Television

References

 http://playbill.com/news/article/photo-call-first-look-at-bryce-ryness-as-miss-trunchbull-and-more-stars-of-the-matilda-tour-350944
 http://us.matildathemusical.com/tour/cast/gabby-gutierrez/
 http://www.latimes.com/entertainment/arts/la-ca-cm-matildas-20150628-story.html

External links
Gabby Gutierrez' Broadway credits page

2005 births
Living people
21st-century Filipino actresses
Filipino stage actresses
American child actresses
American actresses of Filipino descent
People from Bukidnon
Actresses from New York City
21st-century Filipino singers
21st-century Filipino women singers
21st-century American women